The Samsung E2130 is a mobile phone developed by Samsung Electronics. This phone is specially designed for multimedia purposes and includes the new dual speaker, MP3 Player, VGA Camera and FM Radio. The phone is marketed by the name of 'Samsung Guru E2130' in India.

Specifications

Band
GSM and EDGE : 900/1800

Network
GPRS

Browser
Openwave

Display
TFT LCD Screen
128 x 160 Resolution
1.77 inches Screen Size

Camera
VGA Camera
Digital Zoom
Single/Frame Shot Mode
Gray/Negative/Sepia/Red/Green/Blue Photo Effects
Video Recording

Multimedia
Video Player
MP3 Player
Polyphonic and MP3 Ringtones

Fun and Entertainment
Java games
FM Radio (with built-in antenna)
FM Recording
Java software

Connectivity
Bluetooth
USB
WAP
HTML Browser
SyncML(DM)

Memory
7 MB Built-in Memory
MicroSD Support (up to 2GB)

Utilities
Calendar
Scheduler
Clock with Alarm
World Time
Converter
Calculator
Stopwatch
Countdown Timer

Call Functions
Speakerphone
Caller ID
Call Cost
Call Time

Security
Mobile Tracker
SIM Lock
Phone Lock

E2130
Mobile phones introduced in 2009